Tilsley Park is an athletics stadium in Abingdon-on-Thames, Oxfordshire, which is home to Oxford Saints American Football Club. It is managed by Abingdon School on behalf of Vale of White Horse District Council.

Abingdon School took over the management of Tilsley Park in 2014 and since then has undertaken a full programme of improvement and investment including a new 4G surface and throws area, as well as the refurbishment of the facility’s social areas. Tilsley Park now provides some of the best sporting facilities in the region for a variety of clubs and organisations.

References

External links 
 Tilsley Park

Athletics (track and field) venues in England
Rugby league stadiums in England
Sport in Oxfordshire
Multi-purpose stadiums in the United Kingdom
Oxford Rugby League
American football venues in the United Kingdom